Glaucocharis is a genus of moths of the family Crambidae described by Edward Meyrick in 1938.

Species

References

Diptychophorini
Crambidae genera
Taxa named by Edward Meyrick